The  refers to the Imperial Japanese government's suppression of a perceived threat from the political left after the fall of Nanjing during the Shōwa period. During the incident, approximately 400 people were arrested by the authorities between December 1937 and February 1938. Amongst those arrested during the incident were Saburō Eda, Kanson Arahata, Hitoshi Yamakawa, Kōzō Sasaki and Ryokichi Minobe.

See also
Japanese dissidence during the Shōwa period
Yokohama Incident

References

Political repression in Japan